Stephen Lee "Steve" Klein (born September 29, 1979) is an American musician and record producer. He is most famous for being the co-founder of Florida rock group New Found Glory, for whom he was the primary lyricist and rhythm guitarist.

Career and Arrest
Having formed New Found Glory with frontman Jordan Pundik in 1997, Klein performed on seven of the band's ten studio albums. Klein also contributed guitar to the band's now defunct alter-ego side project, The International Superheroes of Hardcore, where he was known under the pseudonym of "Mr. Mosh". Klein made his production debut in 2011, on Man Overboard's self titled second album.

The band announced in December 2013 that Klein was no longer in the band, due to "personal differences."

On March 12, 2014, idobi Radio reported that on the same day New Found Glory removed Klein from the band, Klein was arraigned on multiple felony charges, including lewd acts with a minor, and possession of child pornography. Since 2016, he has been involved in mixing and producing music bands. On February 9, 2021, Klein pleaded no contest to a charge of Felony Indecent Exposure and on March 2, Klein was sentenced to a two-year formal probation and will be registered as a sex offender for 10 years.

Discography

with New Found Glory

1997: It's All About The Girls (EP)
1998: Waiting (EP)
1999: Nothing Gold Can Stay
2000: From the Screen to Your Stereo (EP)
2000: New Found Glory
2002: Sticks and Stones
2004: Catalyst
2006: Coming Home
2007: From the Screen to Your Stereo Part II
2008: Hits
2008: Tip of the Iceberg (EP)
2009: Not Without a Fight
2011: Radiosurgery

with International Superheroes of Hardcore

2008: Takin' it Ova!
2008: HPxHC (EP)

as Producer

2011: Man Overboard (Man Overboard album)
2013: What You Don't See
2013: Heart Attack (Man Overboard album)
2013: The Finer Things (album)

Record labels
with New Found Glory
Fiddler Records (1997)
Eulogy Records (1999)
Drive-Thru Records/Geffen Records (2000–2007)
Bridge 9 Records (2008–2013)
Epitaph Records (2009–2013)

References

1979 births
Living people
Rhythm guitarists
American rock musicians
American rock guitarists
American male guitarists
American lyricists
Songwriters from Florida
Geffen Records artists
Epitaph Records artists
Musicians from Coral Springs, Florida
Jews in punk rock
Guitarists from Florida
21st-century American guitarists
21st-century American male musicians
New Found Glory members
American people convicted of child sexual abuse
American male songwriters